= Democracy and Freedom Web =

Defunct Chinese online publication

- Founded: June 12, 2001
- Dissolved: July 16, 2006
- Founder: Wu Wei

The Democracy and Freedom Web, also known as Perspectives Web, was a Mainland China-based website founded by Wu Wei on June 12, 2001. It was officially registered and filed in Beijing, Chengdu and Guangzhou and other places. The website was shut down, blocked, hacked or otherwise incapacitated by the Chinese authorities forty-eight times for discussing political reforms, human rights and other sensitive topics. However, every time the website was closed, it would go back online.

== Shut down ==
Democracy and Freedom Web was disabled for publishing articles mourning Zhao Ziyang. On July 16, 2006, the website was completely closed.
